The Apple ecosystem is a term used to describe Apple Inc.'s digital ecosystem of products, including the iPhone, iPad, Apple Watch, HomePod etc. It is often praised for its seamless integration and optimization between various networks of devices, software and services, and is largely emphasized by Apple's focus on privacy. It is also known for its ability to lock users into the network where it is difficult to escape.

Apple products often unlock extra features when paired with other Apple products, as opposed to alternatives. Privacy is also considered a major perk of the ecosystem, as Apple markets its products with high standards of privacy, sometimes using it as a selling point over competitors.

"Walled garden" 

Apple's ecosystem is often described as a walled garden. While peripherals such as AirPods, HomePods and AirTags integrate complementarily into the ecosystem, with products such as the iPhone, it does not function as well or with as many features with competitive devices such as Android smartphones. Also, it is not easy to switch from the ecosystem once users have immersed themselves into it, as it is designed to keep users from leaving.

See also 

 Digital ecosystem
 Epic Games vs Apple
 Facebook#Phone data and activity

References

External links 

 Privacy at Apple
 Ecosystem at Apple Developer

Apple Inc.
Computing and society
Social systems